Mis cinco hijos is a 1948 Argentine film, directed by Orestes Caviglia and Bernardo Spoliansky and written by Nathán Pinzón and Ricardo Setaro. It was premiered on September 2, 1948.

Cast
  Tito Alonso
  Pola Alonso
  Iris Alonso
  Mario Alonso
  Héctor Alonso
  Ilde Pirovano
  Horacio Priani
  Mario Giusti
  Dora del Río
  Roberto Durán
  Juan Ramón Alberti
  Pablo Cumo
  Juan Carrara		
  Roberto Chanel		
  Rafael Chumbito		
  Rodolfo Crespi		
  Carlos Escobares		
  Rubén Hernández		
  Alberto Morán		
  Pedro Pompillo	
  Osvaldo Pugliese		
  Domingo Sapelli		
  Ricardo Trigo

External links
   Mis cinco hijos  in Internet Movie Data Base

1948 films
1940s Spanish-language films
Argentine black-and-white films
1940s Argentine films